Inch Abbey is a ruined Cistercian monastery on the outskirts of Downpatrick, County Down, Northern Ireland.

It was founded by Anglo-Norman John de Courcy in the twelfth century at the site of a previous monastery which had operated from the 9th until earlier in the 12th century. De Courcy established the monastery as penance for his destruction of Erenagh Abbey in 1177.

Its name is derived from the Irish word inis, meaning 'island', referring to the fact that the monastery was originally surrounded by the River Quoile.

It is served by Inch Abbey railway station, which is operated by the Downpatrick and County Down Railway.

References

Monasteries in Northern Ireland
Religious buildings and structures in County Down
Cistercian monasteries in Northern Ireland